Wrestling at the 2017 Islamic Solidarity Games was held in Heydar Aliyev Arena, Heydar Aliyev Sports and Exhibition Complex, Baku, Azerbaijan from 17 May to 21 May 2017.

Medalists

Men's freestyle

Men's Greco-Roman

Women's freestyle

Medal table

References

Official Results

External links
Official website

2017 Islamic Solidarity Games
Islamic Solidarity Games
2017
International wrestling competitions hosted by Azerbaijan